Harry Hartley Benson (October 7, 1909 – May 14, 1943) was a professional American football guard in the National Football League. He played in the 1935 season for the Philadelphia Eagles. The following year, he played for the Los Angeles Bulldogs.

Benson was born in 1909 in Baltimore. He attended Baltimore City College, Western Maryland College, and the University of Baltimore.

He enlisted in the United States Army on January 27, 1941.  Private First Class Benson was killed in action on May 14, 1943, during the Aleutian Islands campaign. His remains were returned from Alaska in September 1948 aboard the transport ship Honda Knot.

References

External links 
 1935 Philadelphia Eagles roster
 Memorial to "Pvt Harry H Benson" at Find a Grave

1909 births
1943 deaths
American football guards
Philadelphia Eagles players
Los Angeles Bulldogs players
Players of American football from Baltimore
United States Army soldiers
United States Army personnel killed in World War II
Military personnel from Baltimore
University of Baltimore alumni
Baltimore City College alumni
Western Maryland College alumni